

The Lioré et Olivier LeO H-47 was a flying boat airliner built in France in 1936. It was designed to operate passenger services over the South Atlantic, but the outbreak of the Second World War caused the type to be used by the French Navy as a maritime patrol aircraft.

Development and design
In 1934, the French air ministry issued a specification for a long-range flying boat to be used by Air France on services over the South Atlantic between Dakar in Senegal and Natal in Brazil. Lioré et Olivier received an order for a prototype of its design to meet this specification, the LeO H-47 on 10 August 1935.

The H-47 was a cantilever high-wing monoplane, with a streamlined hull. A flight deck, which accommodated a crew of five (two pilots, a navigator, a radio operator and a mechanic) and a cabin for four to eight passengers were fully enclosed within the aircraft's hull. The four  Hispano Suiza 12Y engines were mounted in two tractor-pusher pairs above the wing.

The prototype H-47 first flew from Antibes on 25 July 1936, and was destroyed in a crash in May 1937 that was attributed to a wingtip float breaking away whilst the aircraft was in flight. Nevertheless, Air France went ahead with the purchase of five similar (though strengthened) machines, designated H-470, which were put into service as mail planes. These machines were impressed into the French Navy at the outbreak of the Second World War.

The four remaining aircraft remained in use with the Vichy French Navy following the French Armistice, serving as transports between France and Tunisia, before being transferred to Dakar in Senegal in June 1941. The last H-470 was scrapped in August 1943 when stocks of spares ran out.

Operators

 Air France
 French Navy

Specifications

See also

Notes

References

 
 
 
 
 
 
 

1930s French airliners
Flying boats
H-047
Four-engined push-pull aircraft
High-wing aircraft
Aircraft first flown in 1936